William Bradbury may refer to:

William Bradbury (footballer) (1884–1966), English soccer player
William Bradbury (printer) (1799–1869), English printer, co-founder of Bradbury and Evans
William Batchelder Bradbury (1816–1868), American musician
Bill Bradbury (born 1949), U.S. politician
William Hardwick Bradbury (1832–1892), printer and son of William Bradbury

See also
William Bradbery (1776–1860), British watercress pioneer